Royal Melbourne Golf Club is a 36-hole golf club in Australia, located in Black Rock, Victoria, a suburb in southeastern Melbourne. Its West and East courses are respectively ranked number 1 and 6 in Australia.  The West course is ranked in the top-five courses in the world.  Founded  in 1891, it is Australia's oldest extant and continually existing golf club. Unlike many metropolitan golf venues, The Royal Melbourne Golf Club has a capacity for 15,000 spectators.

Royal Melbourne has hosted numerous national and international events. Its 16 Australian Opens are surpassed by only the 17 hosted by The Australian Golf Club. It hosted the 1959 Canada Cup (now Mission Hills World Cup), and the 1972 World Cup. Royal Melbourne hosted the Bicentennial Classic, a tournament to celebrate the Australian Bicentenary in 1988. It was selected by the PGA Tour to hold the Presidents Cup, for the first time outside the United States, in December 1998. The match was convincingly won by the International team, captained by Peter Thomson, an honorary member of Royal Melbourne. The course hosted the Presidents Cup again in November 2011, won by the United States and December 2019. It was the site of the Women's Australian Open for the first time in February 2012, now an LPGA Tour event, and it returned three years later in 2015.

History
Founded in 1891 as the Melbourne Golf Club ("Royal" prefix given in 1895), the founding president was politician Sir James MacBain, and the founding captain was businessman John Munro Bruce (father of Australian prime minister Stanley Bruce). The  principal founding members included  P.K. (Patrick Kinney) McCaughan, a New Zealand pastoralist, parliamentarian, businessman and developer and proprietor of the Old Rialto Hotel building in Collins Street.

The club had to give up its original site at Caulfield, much nearer the city centre, because of increasing urbanization. A new links, the "West course", was started at Sandringham in 1898.
It planned a move to its present location in the mid-1920s. Royal Melbourne's two current courses are known as the "West" and "East" courses. The West course was designed under the strict standards of famous course architect Alister MacKenzie. He visited the eventual site,  located on the renowned Melbourne Sandbelt, south of the city, in 1926. The actual building of the West course was overseen by the famed Australian golfer Alex Russell, as well as the head greenkeeper Mick Morcom; it was completed for play in 1931. The East course was designed by Russell, and was completed in 1932.

Features
A combination comprising 18 holes from both the East and West courses that are limited to the main property ("paddock") is known as the "Composite" course. There have been 21 holes used in the history of the "Composite" course, from 1959 to 2011, depending on the event being held.

The East course is less known compared to its world-renowned sister course, but it has still been held in very high regard since its completion. The West course has several holes that are celebrated internationally, but they are not long compared to the current standards for championship par 4s and 5s. The course is strictly landlocked by existing boundaries, which is why these holes have not been greatly extended in recent decades. Significant restoration of the West course (and East course Composite holes), as well as minor lengthening, took place leading up to the 2011 Presidents Cup. As a secondary measure to lengthening, fairway grasses were changed to Legend Couch. This was in order to restrict the progress of the golf ball along the ground. However the Legend Couch was ultimately considered to be an inferior playing surface and has been oversown with Wintergreen Couch.

Tournaments hosted 

 1896 Australian Amateur
1897 Australian Amateur
1898 Australian Amateur
1902 Australian Amateur
1905 Australian Open
1905 Australian Amateur
1905 Australian PGA Championship
 1907 Australian Open
1907 Australian Amateur
1907 Australian PGA Championship
 1909 Australian Open
1909 Australian Amateur
 1912 Australian Open
1912 Australian Amateur
 1913 Australian Open
1913 Australian Amateur
 1921 Australian Open
1921 Australian Amateur
 1924 Australian Open
1924 Australian PGA Championship
1924 Australian Amateur
 1927 Australian Open
1927 Australian Amateur
1927 Australian PGA Championship
 1933 Australian Open
1933 Australian Amateur
1933 Australian PGA Championship
 1939 Australian Open
1939 Australian Amateur
1939 Australian PGA Championship
1947 Australian PGA Championship
1951 Australian Amateur
 1953 Australian Open
1953 Australian PGA Championship
1961 Australian Amateur
 1963 Australian Open
1965 Victorian Open
1965 Australian Amateur
1978 Australian PGA Championship
1979 Australian PGA Championship
1980 Australian PGA Championship
1981 Australian PGA Championship
1982 Australian PGA Championship
1983 Australian PGA Championship
 1984 Australian Open
 1985 Australian Open
 1987 Australian Open
 1991 Australian Open
2005 Australian Amateur
2012 Women's Australian Open
2013 Australian Masters
2015 Women's Australian Open
2019 President's Cup

See also
List of golf clubs granted Royal status

References

External links

Course Profile on Golf Australia
Great Golf Australia – Royal Melbourne Golf Club

Golf clubs and courses in Victoria (Australia)
Golf clubs and courses designed by Alister MacKenzie
Sporting clubs in Melbourne
Sports venues in Melbourne
1891 establishments in Australia
Sports venues completed in 1891
Presidents Cup venues
Organisations based in Australia with royal patronage
Sport in the City of Bayside
Buildings and structures in the City of Bayside
Royal golf clubs